is a Japanese footballer currently playing as a left-back for JEF United Chiba.

Career statistics

Club
.

Notes

References

External links

2000 births
Living people
Japanese footballers
Association football defenders
J2 League players
J3 League players
Kashima Antlers players
Iwate Grulla Morioka players
JEF United Chiba players